is a Prefectural Natural Park in southeast Aomori Prefecture, Japan. Established in 1956, the park spans  on the borders of the municipalities of Sannohe and Nanbu, and encompasses the  Mount Nakuidake.

See also
 National Parks of Japan

References

Parks and gardens in Aomori Prefecture
Sannohe, Aomori
Nanbu, Aomori
Protected areas established in 1956
1956 establishments in Japan